The Honda CBR150R is a CBR series  single-cylinder sport bike made by Honda. It is currently manufactured in Indonesia by Astra Honda Motor and previously in Thailand by A.P. Honda.



History 

The CBR150R was introduced by Honda as the successor to the 2-stroke NSR150. It has been sold in Thai market starting from 2002 and have been exported to many Asian countries and South Africa. A.P. Honda produces the new fuel-injected (PGM-FI) version in 2010, which has lower power than the carburetted version. The design was shared with the 2011 CBR250R, which in turn borrows from VFR1200F sports tourer. The CBR150R went on sale in India in March 2012. In 2014, Honda updated the CBR150R with the same body design as the CBR300R, which is inspired from the 2012 CBR1000RR. This update was applied to Indonesian market only, while other markets retained the old design. This model is also made locally by Astra Honda Motor. In 2016, Honda introduced a fully updated version of the CBR150R, which has the body inspired from the 2016 CBR500R. This version also has the new engine configuration since its introduction in 2002. Like the 2014 version, this variant is made and sold in Indonesia, and has been exported to the Philippines. In 2018, the ABS option made available in Indonesia, along with a slightly reworked body. This version is also sold in Thailand, replacing the previous locally-assembled 2010 version since 2018.

2014–2016 

In September 2014, a subsidiary of Honda in Indonesia, Astra Honda Motor released the updated version of the CBR150R for Indonesian market. This model has same body design as the CBR300R, which is inspired from the 2012 CBR1000RR and was targeted to replace Thai version of the CBR150R. The bike also uses a diamond truss frame, unlike the previous twin-spar one. The rear bodywork remains the same. Previously, Astra Honda Motor relied on importation of the Thai version for its market.

2016–2021 

In February 2016, Astra Honda Motor released a fully updated version of the CBR150R. Updates includes new engine configuration, different body design, which is inspired from the 2016 CBR500R, all-LED lighting system, and all-digital instrument panel design. The engine is now shared with the 2015 CB150R, 2015 Sonic 150R, and 2016 Winner.

In October 2018, the CBR150R got a minor update for 2019. The ABS variant was added, which its system is integrated to emergency stop signal, along with a redesigned visor (which is higher), cast wheel and disc brake design and 5-way preload adjustable front and rear suspension.

In March 2019, the Indonesian-built CBR150R made its debut in Thailand, replacing the previous locally-assembled 2010 version. In January 2021, this model was replaced by new generation in Indonesia, but still available in other markets.

Performance 
Some performance tests listed here were conducted by Otomotif tabloid from Indonesia in April 2016.

2021–present 

The fourth generation CBR150R was released on 12 January 2021. Based on heavily revised previous generation, this generation has similar design as the 2017 CBR250RR and equipped with front upside down suspension as standard. It has 18 hp, 14.4Nm torque and 151 kg curb weight.

Specifications

References

External links 

 Official website (Indonesia)
 Official website (Thailand)

CBR150R
Sport bikes
Motorcycles introduced in 2002